A union representative, union steward, or shop steward is an employee of an organization or company who represents and defends the interests of their fellow employees as a labor union member and official. Rank-and-file members of the union hold this position voluntarily (through democratic election by fellow workers or sometimes by appointment of a higher union body) while maintaining their role as an employee of the firm. As a result, the union steward becomes a significant link and conduit of information between the union leadership and rank-and-file workers.

Duties 
The duties of a union steward vary according to each labor union's constitutional mandate for the position. In general, most union stewards perform the following functions:
Monitor and enforce the provisions of the collective bargaining agreement (labor contract) to ensure both the firm and union worker are not violating the terms of the agreement.
Ensure that the firm is in compliance with all federal, state and local laws and regulations.
Represent and defend fellow workers whom the firm believes violated company policy or the terms and conditions of the collective bargaining agreement, often through the grievance process.
Communicate and disseminate official union policy, memos and directives to workers in the shop.
Popularize and promote union consciousness and values in the workplace.

Unlike other union representatives, stewards work on the shop floor, connecting workers with union officials at regional or national levels.
The role of shop stewards may vary from being a mere representative of a larger national union towards independent structures with the power of collective bargaining in the workplace.

In political history 
In the United Kingdom, a network called Shop Stewards Movement organised shop stewards against the first World War. In Germany, a network of shop stewards called Revolutionary Stewards took an important role in the revolutionary "January Strike".

Other designations 
Father of the chapel (FoC) or mother of the chapel (MoC) are the titles in the United Kingdom and Australasia referring to a shop steward representing members of a trade union in a printing office or in journalism. The FoC or MoC is assisted by the clerk of the chapel or by a deputy FoC/MoC. In the printing trade, a chapel is the traditional name given to a meeting of compositors. The name originates in the early history of printing in Great Britain, though the National Union of Journalists states that the precise origins of the terms are unclear.

Further reading 

 John Benson, Unions at the Workplace: Shop Steward Leadership and Ideology, 1991.
 Ralf Hoffrogge, Working-Class Politics in the German Revolution. Richard Müller, the Revolutionary Shop Stewards and the Origins of the Council Movement, Brill Publications 2014, .
 Y. Rittau and T. Dundon, 2010, The roles and functions of shop stewards in workplace partnership: evidence from the Republic of Ireland, Employee Relations, Vol 32(1), p. 10-27.

References

Labor relations